Gerald Capeci is an American journalist and author who specializes in coverage of the Five Mafia crime families of New York City. Capeci has been described by news organizations, such as CNN and BBC, as an expert on the American Mafia.

Gang Land
Capeci currently writes a column called Gang Land, which has been published in  New York Post, New York Daily News, and the  New York Sun. Capeci's column Gang Land is now published in his Gangland News website. Since June 2008 it has been a 'for pay' subscription site. Archives of Gang Land can be found at the New York Sun website.

Other works
Capeci has authored several books detailing the inner workings of the New York crime families. In 1993, Capeci and fellow journalist Gene Mustain published the book Murder Machine, an exposé of Roy DeMeo and his crew of mafia hit men. Capeci and Mustain coauthored two other books: Mob Star: The Story of John Gotti (1988) and Gotti: the Rise and Fall (1996). With Tom Robbins he has written Mob Boss: The Life of Little Al D’Arco, the Man Who Brought Down the Mafia. Capeci has also written The Complete Idiot's Guide to the Mafia and Wiseguys Say the Darndest Things: The Quotable Mafia. A compilation of columns was published in the 2003 book Jerry Capeci's Gang Land. From 1999 to 2004, Capeci worked as director of communications at the John Jay College of Criminal Justice. In 2007, he appeared as himself on an episode of The Sopranos.

See also 
Gambino crime family
T. J. English
George Anastasia
Rizzuto crime family
Wiseguy (book)

References

External links
 Jerry Capeci archive at The New York Sun

1944 births
American reporters and correspondents
Non-fiction writers about organized crime in the United States
American people of Italian descent
Living people
People from Brooklyn
HuffPost bloggers
Xavier High School (New York City) alumni